Holenarasipura is a town and taluk in Hassan district of Karnataka. The town is situated on the banks of the Hemavati, one of the  tributaries of the Kaveri.

Demographics
 India census, Holenarasipura had a population of 29,938. Males constitute 51% of the population and females 49%. It has an average literacy rate of 73%, higher than the national average of 59.5%; with male literacy of 78% and female literacy of 68%. 11% of the population is under 6 years of age.

Geography
The taluk and the town are situated downstream of Gorur Dam, making it agriculturally rich. Main crops are Paddy and Tobacco. The region/taluk is also famous for its Cucumbers.
Numerous highways pass through the town of Holenarasipura. They are NH-373, SH-57, SH-8, SH-102, SH-108, and SH-109. Holenarasipura is situated 85 kms from Mysore, 165 kms from state capital Bengaluru and around 200 kms from port city of Mangaluru, via NH-75.

Transportation
The town has two modes of transport; Road and Railways.
Public transport is maintained by buses of KSRTC. It also houses a KSRTC Bus Depot under Hassan division. 
Holenarasipura railway is a single-line broad-gauge between Mysore-Hassan. It comes under Mysore division of South Western Railway Zone. It has railway connectivity to Mysore,  Hassan, Bengaluru, Mangalore, Shivamogga, Hubli-Dharwad and Dadar via Davangere. Nearest international airports are Kannur International Airport and Kempegowda International Airport at 175 kms and 195 kms, respectively.

Places of attraction
 Belur & Halebeedu
 Gorur Dam
 Shravanabelagola
 Chunchanakatte Falls
 Manjarabad Fort
 Bisle ghat
 Mosale Sri Chennakeshava & Shiva temple
 Jenukallu Peak in Sakleshpura taluk

Gallery

Notable people 
 Satchidanandendra Saraswati, philosopher, Advaita and Vedanta thinker.
 H. D. Deve Gowda, former Prime Minister.
 K. S. Ashwath, Kannada actor.
 Koundinya (Y. N. Nagesh), popular detective novelist in Kannada.

See also
Saligrama, Mysore
Ramanathapura
 Arkalgud
 Mangalore
 Keralapura
 Govindanahalli
 Kikkeri
 Panchalingeshwara Temple, Govindanahalli

References

External links

 Town Municipal Council

Cities and towns in Hassan district